The Northeast megalopolis, also known as the Northeast Corridor, Acela Corridor, Boston–Washington corridor, or BosWash, is the world's largest megalopolis in terms of economic output and the second-most populous megalopolis in the United States with 52.3 million residents as of 2010.

Located primarily on the Atlantic Coast in the Northeastern United States with its lower terminus in the upper Southeast, the Northeast megalopolis runs primarily northeast to southwest from the northern suburbs of Boston to the Northern Virginia suburbs of Washington, D.C. It includes many of the nation's most populated cities, including New York City, Philadelphia, Washington, D.C., Boston, Baltimore, and others, along with their metropolitan areas and suburbs. It is also sometimes defined to include smaller urban agglomerations beyond this, such as the Richmond and Hampton Roads regions to the south, Portland, Maine and Manchester, New Hampshire to the north, and Harrisburg, Pennsylvania, to the west.

The Northeast megalopolis extends in a roughly straight line along a section of U.S. Route 1 and Interstate 95. As of 2010, the region contained over 50 million people, about 17% of the U.S. population on less than 2% of the nation's land area, with a population density of approximately 1,000 people per square mile (390 people/km2), compared to the U.S. average of 80.5 per square mile 2 (31 people/km2). America 2050 projections estimate the area will grow to 58.1 million people by 2025.

French geographer Jean Gottmann popularized the term megalopolis in his 1961 study of the region, Megalopolis: The Urbanized Northeastern Seaboard of the United States. Gottmann concluded that the region's cities, while discrete and independent, are uniquely tied to each other through the intermeshing of their suburban zones, taking on some characteristics of a single, massive city: a megalopolis, a term he co-opted from an ancient Greek town of the same name that named itself out of aspirations to become the largest Greek city.

The Northeast megalopolis is home to hundreds of colleges and universities, including Harvard, MIT, Yale, Princeton, Penn, and Johns Hopkins, each of which rank in the top ten in the nation in the 2022-23 U.S. News & World Report Best Colleges Ranking.

Region
The megalopolis encompasses the national capital of Washington, D.C. and most, all, or part of 12 states, including (from north to south): Maine, New Hampshire, Vermont, Massachusetts, Rhode Island, Connecticut, New York, New Jersey, Pennsylvania, Delaware, Maryland, and Virginia. It is linked by Interstate 95 and U.S. Route 1, which start in Miami and Key West, Florida, respectively, and terminate in Maine at the Canadian border, as well as the Northeast Corridor railway line, the busiest passenger rail line in the country that serves Amtrak and several commuter rail agencies. It is home to 52.3 million people as of 2019, and its metropolitan statistical areas are contiguous from Washington, D.C. to Boston. The region is not uniformly populated between the terminal cities, and there are regions nominally within the corridor yet located away from the main transit lines that have been bypassed by urbanization, such as Connecticut's Quiet Corner.

The region accounts for 20% of the U.S. gross domestic product. It is home to the New York Stock Exchange and Nasdaq, the White House, the U.S. Capitol, the U.S. Supreme Court, the headquarters of the United Nations, the headquarters of ABC, NBC, CBS, NPR, PBS, Fox, Comcast, The New York Times Company, USA Today, New York Post, The Wall Street Journal, Newsday, The Washington Post, and The Boston Globe. The headquarters of many major financial firms, including JPMorgan Chase, Citigroup, Goldman Sachs, Fannie Mae, Freddie Mac, Capital One, and Fidelity, are located within the region, which is also home to 54 Fortune Global 500 companies and the U.S. headquarters for 162 of the world's Fortune 500 companies. The region is also the center of the global hedge fund industry, heavily based in New York City and the Connecticut cities of Greenwich and Stamford.

Population

History

Due to its proximity to Europe, the Eastern coast of the United States was among the first regions of the continent to be widely settled. Over time, the cities and towns founded on the East Coast had the advantage of age over most other parts of the U.S. However, it was the Northeast in particular that developed most rapidly, owing to a number of fortuitous circumstances.

While possessing neither particularly rich soil—one exception being New England's Connecticut River Valley—nor exceptional mineral wealth, the region still supports some agriculture and mining. The climate is temperate and not particularly prone to hurricanes or tropical storms, which increase further south. However, the most important factor was the "interpenetration of land and sea," which makes for exceptional harbors, such as those at the Chesapeake Bay, the Port of New York and New Jersey, Narragansett Bay in Providence, Rhode Island, and Boston Harbor. The coastline to the north is rockier and less sheltered, and to the South is smooth and does not feature as many bays and inlets that function as natural harbors. Also featured are navigable rivers that lead deeper into the heartlands, such as the Hudson, Delaware, and Connecticut rivers, which all support large populations and were necessary to early settlers for development. Therefore, while other parts of the country exceeded the region in raw resource value, they were not as easily accessible, and often, access to them necessarily had to pass through the Northeast first.

Modern history 
By 1800, the region included the only three U.S. cities with populations of over 25,000: Philadelphia, New York City, and Baltimore. By 1850, New York City and Philadelphia alone had over 300,000 residents while Baltimore, Boston, Brooklyn (at that time a separate city from New York), Cincinnati, and New Orleans had over 100,000: five were within one 400-mile strip while the last two were each four hundred miles away from the next closest metropolis. The immense concentration of people in one relatively densely packed area gave that region considerable sway through population density over the rest of the nation, which was solidified in 1800 when Washington, D.C., only 38 miles southwest of Baltimore, was made the nation's capital. According to Gottmann, capital cities "will tend to create for and around the seats of power a certain kind of built environment, singularly endowed, for instance, with monumentality, stressing status and ritual, a trait that will increase with duration." The transportation and telecommunications infrastructure that the capital city mandated also spilled over into the rest of the strip.

Additionally, the proximity to Europe, as well as the prominence of Ellis Island as an immigrant processing center, made New York City and cities nearby a "landing wharf for European immigrants," who represented an ever replenished supply of diversity of thought and determined workers. By contrast, the other major source of trans-oceanic immigrants was China, which was farther from the U.S. West Coast than Europe was from the East, and whose ethnicity made them targets of racial discrimination, creating barriers to their seamless integration into American society. By 1950, the region held over one-fifth of the total U.S. population, with a density nearly 15 times that of the national average.

The region has been home to the richest city in the nation for over 200 years: Hartford, Connecticut held the title from the pre–Civil War industrial era until about 1929, and New York City has held it since. Loudoun and Fairfax County, Virginia are the wealthiest counties in the country, and Connecticut’s Gold Coast has one of the highest population densities of families worth over $30 million USD.

Concept

Jean Gottmann wrote his most famous work, Megalopolis, around the central theory that the cities between Washington, D.C. and Boston together form a sort of cohesive, integrated "supercity." He took the term megalopolis from a small Greek town that had been settled in the Classical Era with the hope it would "become the largest of the Greek cities". Though it still exists today, it is just a sleepy agricultural community. The dream of the founders of the original Megalopolis, Gottmann argued, was being realized in the Northeastern U.S. in the 1960s.

Gottmann defined two criteria for a group of cities to be a true megalopolis: “polynuclear structure” and “manifold concentration:” that is, the presence of multiple urban nuclei, which exist independently of each other yet are integrated in a special way relative to sites outside their area.

To this end, "twin cities" such as Minneapolis–Saint Paul in Minnesota would not be considered a megalopolitan area since both cities are fairly integrated with each other even though both cities have distinct city borders and large central business districts. Large communities on the outskirts of major cities, such as Silver Spring or Bethesda in Maryland outside of Washington, DC, are clearly distinct areas with even their own downtowns. However, they are not in any way independent of their host city, being still considered suburbs that would almost certainly not have developed in the ways that they have without the presence of Washington.

On the other hand, while the major cities of the Boston–Washington megalopolis all are distinct, independent cities, they are closely linked by transportation and telecommunications. Neil Gustafson showed in 1961 that the vast majority of phone calls originating in the region terminate elsewhere in the region, and it is only a minority that are routed to elsewhere in the United States or abroad. In 2010 automobiles carried 80% of Boston-Washington corridor travel; intercity buses 8–9%; Amtrak 6%; and airlines 5%. Business ventures unique to the region have sprung up that capitalize on the interconnectedness of the megalopolis, such as airline shuttle services that operate short flights between Boston-New York and New York-Washington that leave every half-hour, Amtrak's Acela Express high-speed rail service from Washington to Boston, and the Chinatown bus lines, which offer economy transportation between the cities' Chinatowns and elsewhere. Other bus lines operating in the megalopolitan area owned by national or international corporations have also appeared, such as BoltBus and Megabus. These ventures indicate not only the dual "independent nuclei"/"interlinked system" nature of the megalopolis, but also a broad public understanding of and capitalization on the concept.

Among examples of academic acceptance of Gottmann's Megalopolis concept, John Rennie Short authored a major update to Gottmann’s book in 2007, Liquid City: Megalopolis and the Contemporary Northeast. The National Geographic Society released a map in 1994 of the region at the time of the Revolutionary War and in present day, which borrowed Gottmann's book's title and referred to him by name. Senator Claiborne Pell wrote a full-length book entitled Megalopolis Unbound in 1966, which summarized and then expanded on the original book to outline his vision for a cohesive transportation policy in the region (of which his state, Rhode Island, is part). Futurists Herman Kahn and Anthony Wiener coined the term "BosWash" in 1967 in their predictions concerning the area described by Gottmann as "Megalopolis".

Use in fiction
The immensity of the megalopolis, and the idea that it might one day form an actual uninterrupted city, has inspired several authors and has resulted in extrapolations of the current megalopolis appearing in fiction. Examples include William Gibson's Sprawl trilogy, which envisions a future Boston–Atlanta Metropolitan Axis known as The Sprawl, and the even larger Quebec–Florida Mega-City One from the Judge Dredd comic books and films.

See also
 Megalopolis
 BosWash
 Conurbation
 East Coast of the United States
 Megaregions of the United States
 Metropolitan statistical area
 Mid-Atlantic (United States)
 Northeast Corridor
 Northeastern United States
 Quebec City–Windsor Corridor, a densely populated corridor in Canada

References

External links

 
Megapolitan areas of the United States
Megalopolis